Several destroyers of the Imperial Japanese Navy have been named :

, an  launched and sold to Italy in 1916 as Audace; captured by Germany in 1943 and renamed TA 20; sunk in 1944.
, a  launched in 1917; retired in 1934.
, a  launched in 1936; sunk in 1943.

Japanese Navy ship names
Imperial Japanese Navy ship names